Ibrahim A. Omoson was the Chief Justice of Gambia from 1992 until 1995. He was succeeded by Omar H. Aghali in 1995.

References 

Chief justices of the Gambia
20th-century Gambian judges
Possibly living people
Year of birth missing